The following lists the seasons of the Melbourne-based professional Twenty20 cricket club, the Melbourne Renegades who compete in the Big Bash League.

Summary

References

Melbourne Renegades seasons